The Rainbow Trail is a 1925 American silent Western film written and directed by Lynn Reynolds. It is based on the 1915 novel The Rainbow Trail by Zane Grey. The film stars Tom Mix, Anne Cornwall, George Bancroft, Lucien Littlefield, Mark Hamilton, and Vivien Oakland. The film was released on May 24, 1925, by Fox Film Corporation.

Plot
As described in a film magazine review, John Shefford has to enter a lawless settlement in order to reach the deep valley imprisoning his uncle and companions. Fighting against heavy odds, he rescues a young woman to save her from a forced marriage.

Cast

References

External links

 
 

1925 films
1925 Western (genre) films
Fox Film films
Films directed by Lynn Reynolds
American black-and-white films
Silent American Western (genre) films
1920s English-language films
1920s American films